Mexico participated in the 2011 Parapan American Games.

Medalists

Archery

Mexico sent two male athletes to compete.

Athletics

Mexico sent 43 male and 23 female athletes to compete.

Boccia

Mexico sent eight male and two female athletes to compete.

Cycling

Mexico sent five male and one female athlete to compete in the road cycling tournament.

Football 5-a-side

Mexico sent a team of ten athletes to compete.

Goalball

Mexico sent two teams of six athletes each to compete in the men's and women's tournaments.

Judo

Mexico sent four male and three female athletes to compete.

Powerlifting

Mexico sent seven male and six female athletes to compete.

Sitting volleyball

Mexico sent a team of twelve athletes to compete.

Swimming

Mexico sent fifteen male and seventeen female swimmers to compete.

Table tennis

Mexico sent eight male and six female table tennis players to compete.

Wheelchair basketball

Mexico sent two teams of twelve athletes each to compete in the men's and women's tournaments.

Wheelchair tennis

Mexico sent two male and two female athletes to compete.

Nations at the 2011 Parapan American Games
2011 in Mexican sports
Mexico at the Pan American Games